Humberto Contreras Canales was a Chilean footballer. He competed in the men's tournament at the 1928 Summer Olympics.

References

External links
 
 

Year of birth missing
Year of death missing
Chilean footballers
Chile international footballers
Olympic footballers of Chile
Footballers at the 1928 Summer Olympics
Place of birth missing
Association football forwards
Unión Española footballers
Santiago Wanderers footballers